The Language poets (or L=A=N=G=U=A=G=E poets, after the magazine of that name) are an avant-garde group or tendency in United States poetry that emerged in the late 1960s and early 1970s. The poets included: Bernadette Mayer, Leslie Scalapino, Stephen Rodefer, Bruce Andrews, Charles Bernstein, Ron Silliman, Barrett Watten, Lyn Hejinian, Tom Mandel, Bob Perelman, Rae Armantrout, Alan Davies, Carla Harryman, Clark Coolidge, Hannah Weiner, Susan Howe, James Sherry, and Tina Darragh.

Language poetry emphasizes the reader's role in bringing meaning out of a work. It plays down expression, seeing the poem as a construction in and of language itself. In more theoretical terms, it challenges the "natural" presence of a speaker behind the text; and emphasizes the disjunction and the materiality of the signifier. These poets favor prose poetry, especially in longer and non-narrative forms.

In developing their poetics, members of the Language school took as their starting point the emphasis on method evident in the modernist tradition, particularly as represented by Gertrude Stein, William Carlos Williams, and Louis Zukofsky. Language poetry is an example of poetic postmodernism. Its immediate postmodern precursors were the New American poets, a term including the New York School, the Objectivist poets, the Black Mountain School, the Beat poets, and the San Francisco Renaissance.

Language poetry has been a controversial topic in American letters from the 1970s to the present. Even the name has been controversial: while a number of poets and critics have used the name of the journal to refer to the group, many others have chosen to use the term, when they used it at all, without the equals signs. The terms "language writing" and "language-centered writing" are also commonly used, and are perhaps the most generic terms. None of the poets associated with the tendency has used the equal signs when referring to the writing collectively. Its use in some critical articles can be taken as an indicator of the author's outsider status. There is also debate about whether or not a writer can be called a language poet without being part of that specific coterie; is it a style or is it a group of people?

Online writing samples of many language poets can be found on internet sites, including blogs and sites maintained by authors and through gateways such as the Electronic Poetry Center, PennSound, and UbuWeb.

History

The movement has been highly decentralized. On the West Coast, an early seed of language poetry was the launch of This magazine, edited by Robert Grenier and Barrett Watten, in 1971. L=A=N=G=U=A=G=E, edited by Bruce Andrews and Charles Bernstein, ran from 1978 to 1982, and was published in New York. It featured poetics, forums on writers in the movement, and themes such as "The Politics of Poetry" and "Reading Stein". Ron Silliman's poetry newsletter Tottel's (1970–81), Bruce Andrews's selections in a special issue of Toothpick (1973), as well as Lyn Hejinian's editing of Tuumba Press, and James Sherry's editing of Roof magazine also contributed to the development of ideas in language poetry. The first significant collection of language-centered poetics was the article, "The Politics of the Referent," edited by Steve McCaffery for the Toronto-based publication, Open Letter (1977).

In an essay from the first issue of This, Grenier declared: "I HATE SPEECH". Grenier's ironic statement (itself a speech act), and a questioning attitude to the referentiality of language, became central to language poets. Ron Silliman, in the introduction to his anthology In the American Tree, appealed to a number of young U.S. poets who were dissatisfied with the work of the Black Mountain and Beat poets.

The range of poetry published that focused on "language" in This, Tottel's, L=A=N=G=U=A=G=E, and also in several other key publications and essays of the time, established the field of discussion that would emerge as Language (or L=A=N=G=U=A=G=E) poetry.

During the 1970s, a number of magazines published poets who would become associated with the Language movement. These included A Hundred Posters (edited by Alan Davies), Big Deal, Dog City, Hills, Là Bas, MIAM, Oculist Witnesses, QU, and Roof. Poetics Journal, which published writings in poetics and was edited by Lyn Hejinian and Barrett Watten, appeared from 1982 to 1998. Significant early gatherings of Language writing included Bruce Andrews's selection in Toothpick (1973); Silliman's selection "The Dwelling Place: 9 Poets" in Alcheringa, (1975), and Charles Bernstein's "A Language Sampler," in The Paris Review (1982).

Certain poetry reading series, especially in New York, Washington, D.C. and San Francisco, were important venues for the performance of this new work, and for the development of dialogue and collaboration among poets. Most important were Ear Inn reading series in New York, founded in 1978 by Ted Greenwald and Charles Bernstein and later organized through James Sherry's Segue Foundation and curated by Mitch Highfill, Jeanne Lance, Andrew Levy, Rob Fitterman, Laynie Brown, Alan Davies, and The Poetry Society of New York; Folio Books in Washington, D.C., founded by Doug Lang; and the Grand Piano reading series in San Francisco, which was curated by Barrett Watten, Ron Silliman, Tom Mandel, Rae Armantrout, Ted Pearson, Carla Harryman, and Steve Benson at various times.

Poets, some of whom have been mentioned above, who were associated with the first wave of Language poetry include: Rae Armantrout, Stephen Rodefer (1940–2015), Steve Benson, Abigail Child, Clark Coolidge, Tina Darragh, Alan Davies, Carla Harryman, P. Inman, Lynne Dryer, Madeline Gins, Michael Gottlieb, Fanny Howe, Susan Howe, Tymoteusz Karpowicz, Jackson Mac Low (1922–2004), Tom Mandel, Bernadette Mayer, Steve McCaffery, Michael Palmer, Ted Pearson, Bob Perelman, Nick Piombino, Peter Seaton (1942–2010), Joan Retallack, Erica Hunt, James Sherry, Jean Day, Kit Robinson, Ted Greenwald, Leslie Scalapino (1944–2010), Diane Ward, Rosmarie Waldrop, and Hannah Weiner (1928–1997). This list accurately reflects the high proportion of female poets across the spectrum of the Language writing movement. African-American poets associated with the movement include Hunt, Nathaniel Mackey, and Harryette Mullen.

Poetics of language writing: theory and practice
Language poetry emphasizes the reader's role in bringing meaning out of a work. It developed in part in response to what poets considered the uncritical use of expressive lyric sentiment among earlier poetry movements. In the 1950s and 1960s, certain groups of poets had followed William Carlos Williams in his use of idiomatic American English rather than what they considered the 'heightened', or overtly poetic language favored by the New Criticism movement. New York School poets like Frank O'Hara and the Black Mountain group emphasized both speech and everyday language in their poetry and poetics.

In contrast, some of the Language poets emphasized metonymy, synecdoche and extreme instances of paratactical structures in their compositions, which, even when employing everyday speech, created a far different texture. The result is often alien and difficult to understand at first glance, which is what Language poetry intends: for the reader to participate in creating the meaning of the poem.

Watten's & Grenier's magazine This (and This Press which Watten edited), along with the magazine L=A=N=G=U=A=G=E, published work by notable Black Mountain poets such as Robert Creeley and Larry Eigner. Silliman considers Language poetry to be a continuation (albeit incorporating a critique) of the earlier movements. Watten has emphasized the discontinuity between the New American poets, whose writing, he argues, privileged self-expression, and the Language poets, who see the poem as a construction in and of language itself. In contrast, Bernstein has emphasized the expressive possibilities of working with constructed, and even found, language.

Gertrude Stein, particularly in her writing after Tender Buttons, and Louis Zukofsky, in his book-length poem A, are the modernist poets who most influenced the Language school. In the postwar period, John Cage, Jackson Mac Low, and poets of the New York School (John Ashbery, Frank O'Hara, Ted Berrigan) and Black Mountain School (Robert Creeley, Charles Olson, and Robert Duncan) are most recognizable as precursors to the Language poets. Many of these poets used procedural methods based on mathematical sequences and other logical organising devices to structure their poetry. This practice proved highly useful to the language group. The application of process, especially at the level of the sentence, was to become the basic tenet of language praxis. Stein's influence was related to her own frequent use of language divorced from reference in her own writings. The language poets also drew on the philosophical works of Ludwig Wittgenstein, especially the concepts of language-games, meaning as use, and family resemblance among different uses, as the solution to the Problem of universals.

Language poetry in the early 21st century
In many ways, what Language poetry is is still being determined. Most of the poets whose work falls within the bounds of the Language school are still alive and still active contributors. During the late 1980s and early 1990s, Language poetry was widely received as a significant movement in innovative poetry in the U.S., a trend accentuated by the fact that some of its leading proponents took up academic posts in the Poetics, Creative Writing and English Literature departments in prominent universities (University of Pennsylvania, SUNY Buffalo, Wayne State University, University of California, Berkeley, University of California, San Diego, University of Maine, the Iowa Writers' Workshop).

Language poetry also developed affiliations with literary scenes outside the States, notably England, Canada (through the Kootenay school of writing in Vancouver), France, the USSR, Brazil, Finland, Sweden, New Zealand, and Australia. It had a particularly interesting relation to the UK avant-garde: in the 1970s and 1980s there were extensive contacts between American Language poets and veteran UK writers like Tom Raworth and Allen Fisher, or younger figures such as Caroline Bergvall, Maggie O'Sullivan, cris cheek, and Ken Edwards (whose magazine Reality Studios was instrumental in the transatlantic dialogue between American and UK avant-gardes). Other writers, such as J.H. Prynne and those associated with the so-called "Cambridge" poetry scene (Rod Mengham, Douglas Oliver, Peter Riley) were perhaps more skeptical about language poetry and its associated polemics and theoretical documents, though Geoff Ward wrote a book about the phenomenon.

A second generation of poets influenced by the Language poets includes Eric Selland (also a noted translator of modern Japanese poetry), Lisa Robertson, Juliana Spahr, the Kootenay School poets, conceptual writing, Flarf collectives, and many others.

A significant number of women poets, and magazines and anthologies of innovative women's poetry, have been associated with language poetry on both sides of the Atlantic. They often represent a distinct set of concerns. Among the poets are Leslie Scalapino, Madeline Gins, Susan Howe, Lyn Hejinian, Carla Harryman, Rae Armantrout, Jean Day, Hannah Weiner, Tina Darragh, Erica Hunt, Lynne Dreyer, Harryette Mullen, Beverly Dahlen, Johanna Drucker, Abigail Child, and Karen Mac Cormack; among the magazines HOW/ever, later the e-based journal HOW2; and among the anthologies Out of Everywhere: Linguistically Innovative Poetry by Women in North America & the UK, edited by Maggie O'Sullivan for Reality Street Editions in London (1996) and Mary Margaret Sloan's Moving Borders: Three Decades of Innovative Writing by Women (Jersey City: Talisman Publishers, 1998).

Ten of the Language poets, each of whom at one time curated the reading series at the San Francisco coffee house of that name, collaborated to write The Grand Piano, "an experiment in collective autobiography" published in ten small volumes. Editing and communication for the collaboration was accomplished over email. Authors of The Grand Piano were Lyn Hejinian, Carla Harryman, Rae Armantrout, Tom Mandel, Ron Silliman, Barrett Watten, Steve Benson, Bob Perelman, Ted Pearson, and Kit Robinson. An eleventh member of the project, Alan Bernheimer, served as an archivist and contributed one essay on the filmmaker Warren Sonbert. The authors of The Grand Piano sought to reconnect their writing practices and to "recall and contextualize events from the period of the late 1970s."
 Each volume of The Grand Piano features essays by all ten authors in different sequence; often responding to prompts and problems arising from one another's essays in the series.

Some poets, such as Norman Finkelstein, have stressed their own ambiguous relationship to "Language poetry", even after decades of fruitful engagement. Finkelstein, in a discussion with Mark Scroggins about The Grand Piano, points to a "risk" when previously marginalized poets try to write their own literary histories, "not the least of which is a self-regard bordering on narcissism".

See also
 List of poetry groups and movements
 List of literary movements

References

Further reading

Anthologies
Allen, Donald, ed. The New American Poetry 1945-1960. New York: Grove Press, 1960.
Andrews, Bruce, and Charles Bernstein, eds. The "L=A=N=G=U=A=G=E" Book. Carbondale: Southern Illinois University Press, 1984.
Bernstein, Charles, ed. "Language Sampler," Paris Review, 1982 
 "43 Poets (1984)." boundary 2 
 The Politics of Poetic Form: Poetry and Public Policy. New York: Roof, 1990.
Hejinian, Lyn and Barrett Watten, eds.."A Guide to Poetics Journal: Writing in the Expanded Field, 1982–1998." Wesleyan University Press, 2013 
Hoover, Paul, ed. Postmodern American Poetry: A Norton Anthology. New York: Norton, 1994.
Messerli, Douglas, ed. Language Poetries. New York: New Directions, 1987.
Silliman, Ron, ed. In the American Tree. Orono, Me.: National Poetry Foundation, 1986; reprint ed. with a new afterword, 2002. An anthology of language poetry that serves as a very useful primer.

Books: Poetics and criticism
Andrews, Bruce. Paradise and Method. Evanston: Northwestern University Press, 1996.
Beach, Christopher, ed. Artifice and Indeterminacy:  An Anthology of New Poetics. Tuscaloosa:  The University of Alabama Press, 1998
Bernstein, Charles. Content's Dream: Essays 1975–1984. Los Angeles: Sun & Moon Press, 1985
 A Poetics. Cambridge: Harvard University Press, 1992
 My Way; Speeches and Poems. University of Chicago Press, 1999
 Attack of the Difficult Poems: Essays and Inventions. University of Chicago Press, 2011
 "Pitch of Poetry." University of Chicago Press, 2016.
Davies, Alan. Signage. New York: Roof Books, 1987.
Friedlander, Ben. Simulcast: Four Experiments in Criticism. Tuscaloosa: University of Alabama Press, 2004.
Hartley, George. Textual Politics and the Language Poets. Bloomington: Indiana University Press, 1989.
Hejinian, Lyn. The Language of Inquiry. Berkeley: University of California Press, 2000.
Howe, Susan. My Emily Dickinson. Berkeley: North Atlantic Books, 1988. Rpt, New Directions, 2007.
 The Birth-Mark: Unsettling the Wilderness in American Literary History. Middletown, CT: Wesleyan University Press, 1993.
Huk, Romana, ed. Assembling Alternatives: Reading Postmodern Poetries Transnationally. Middletown, Conn.: Wesleyan University Press, 2003.
Lutzkanova-Vassileva, Albena, "The Testimonies of Russian and American Postmodern Poetry: Reference, Trauma, and History." New York: Bloomsbury, 2013
McCaffery, Steve. North of Intention: Critical Writings 1973–1986. New York: Roof Books, 1986.
 Prior to Meaning: The Protosemantic and Poetics. Evanston: Northwestern UP, 2001.
Perelman, Bob. The Marginalization of Poetry: Language Writing and Literary History. Princeton, N.J.: Princeton University Press, 1996.
Piombino, Nick. Boundary of Blur. New York: Roof Books, 1993
 Theoretical Objects. Green Integer Press, 1999.
Ratcliffe, Stephen. Listening to Reading. Albany, NY: State University of New York Press, 2000
Reinfeld, Linda. Language Poetry: Writing as Rescue. Baton Rouge: LSU Press, 1992.
Silliman, Ron. The New Sentence. New York: Roof Books, 1987. An early collection of talks and essays that situates language poetry into contemporary political thought, linguistics, and literary tradition. See esp. section II.
Scalapino, Leslie. How Phenomena Appear to Unfold. Elmwood: Potes & Poets, 1989.
 Objects in the Terrifying Tense / Longing from Taking Place. Roof Books, 1994.
 The Public World / Syntactically Impermanence. Wesleyan University Press, 1999.
 How Phenomena Appear to Unfold. Litmus Press, 2011.
Vickery, Ann. Leaving Lines of Gender: A Feminist Genealogy of Language Writing. Middletown, Conn.: Wesleyan University Press, 2000.
Ward, Geoff. Language Poetry and the American Avant-Garde. Keele: British Association for American Studies, 1993.
Watten, Barrett. The Constructivist Moment: From Material Text to Cultural Poetics. Middletown, Conn.: Wesleyan University Press, 2003. See esp. chaps. 2 and 3.
 Total Syntax. Carbondale: Southern Illinois University Press, 1984.

Books: Cross-genre and cultural writing
Armantrout, Rae. True. Berkeley, CA: Atelos | (Small Press Distribution), 1998. 
Armantrout, Rae. Collected Prose. San Diego: Singing Horse, 2007.
Davies, Alan. Candor. Berkeley, CA, 1990.
Mandel, Tom. Realism. Providence, RI: Burning Deck.
Perelman, Bob, et al. The Grand Piano: An Experiment in Collective Autobiography. Detroit, MI: Mode A/This Press, 2006. . Described as an ongoing experiment in collective autobiography by ten writers identified with Language poetry in San Francisco. The project will consist of 10 volumes in all.
Piombino, Nick. Fait Accompli. Queens, NY: Factory School, 2006.
Scalapino, Leslie. Zither & Autobiography. Middletown, CT: Wesleyan, 2003.
Silliman, Ron. Under Albany. Cambridge, UK: Salt Publishing, 2004. 
Watten, Barrett. Bad History. Berkeley, CA: Atelos | Small Press Distribution, 1998.

Articles
Andrews, Bruce, "L=A=N=G=U=A=G=E", in The Little Magazine in Contemporary America, ed. Ian Morris and Joanne Diaz (Chicago: University of Chicago Press, 2015). Available online via Andrew's faculty page at Fordham University: Fordham English Connect.
Bartlett, Lee, "What is 'Language Poetry'?" Critical Inquiry 12 (1986): 741–752. Available through JStor.
Bernstein, Charles, "The Expanded Field of L=A=N=G=U=A=G=E," in Routledge Companion to Experimental Literature, ed. Joe Bray, Alison Gibbons, Brian McHale (London: Routledge, 2012).
Greer, Michael, "Ideology and Theory in Recent Experimental Writing or, the Naming of "Language Poetry," boundary 2, vol. 16, no. 2/3 (Winter/Spring, 1989), pp. 335–355.
Koirala, Saroj, "Linking Words with the World: The Language Poetry Mission", Tribhuvan University Journal, vol. 29 (2016), no. 1, pp. 175–190. .
Perloff, Marjorie, "The Word as Such: LANGUAGE: Poetry in the Eighties", American Poetry Review (May–June 1984), 13(3):15–22.

External links
Douglas Messerli's Introduction to the 2003 edition of "Language" Poetries (New Directions, 1987)
Barrett Watten, "On First Looking into Wikipedia's 'Language'" (2006 blog post)
Suman Chakraborty, "Meaning, Unmeaning and the Poetics of L=A=N=G=U=A=G=E" (2008)
Electronic Poetry Center
L=A=N=G=U=A=G=E Magazine online archive
Bruce Andrews-edited issue of Toothpick (1973)
The Dwelling Place: 9 Poets, Ron Silliman-edited issue of Alcheringa" (1974), via J. Henry Chunko blog of Danny Snelson (archived from the original on 2011-07-27)
Index for full run of This magazine
Bruce Andrews, "THE POETICS OF L=A=N=G=U=A=G=E"
Leevi Lehto, "In the Un-American Tree: The L=A=N=G=U=A=G=E Poetries and Their Aftermath, with a Special Reference to Charles Bernstein Translated" (one of the keynote addresses at the International Conference on 20th Century American Poetry, hosted by Central China Normal University, Wuhan, China, July 21, 2007)
Silliman's Blog: A weblog focused on contemporary poetry and poetics
Charles Bernstein author page and web log
New Poetics Colloquium proceedings (1985)
Robert Archambeau, "Bleed-Over and Decadence, or: No Bones About It, They're Talking About Language Poetry" (2005 blog post)
The Grand Piano website devoted to the "collective autobiography" by 10 of the so-called "West Coast" group of Language poets
Geoff Ward, Language Poetry and the American Avant-Garde (1993)
Andrew Epstein, "Verse vs. Verse: The Language Poets are taking over the academy. But will success spoil their integrity?" (Lingua Franca, Sept. 2000: 45–54)
Jerome McGann, "Contemporary Poetry, Alternate Routes" (chapter from his 1988 book, Social Values and Poetic Acts)
Kate Lilley, "This L=A=N=G=U=A=G=E" (1997), Jacket Magazine website
Eleana Kim, Language Poetry: Dissident Practices and the Makings of a Movement (1994), with an extensive bibliography

 
Poetry movements
Modernist poetry in English
American poetry
Contemporary literature
20th-century American literature
American literary movements